Saarde is a municipality located in Pärnu County, one of the 15 counties of Estonia.

Settlements
Town
Kilingi-Nõmme

Small borough
Tihemetsa

Villages
Allikukivi - Ilvese - Jaamaküla - Jäärja - Kalda - Kalita - Kamali - Kanaküla - Kärsu - Kikepera - Kõveri - Lähkma - Laiksaare - Lanksaare - Leipste - Lodja - Marana - Marina - Metsaääre - Mustla - Oissaare -  Pihke - Rabaküla - Reinu - Ristiküla - Saarde - Saunametsa - Sigaste - Surju - Tali - Tuuliku - Tõlla - Väljaküla - Veelikse - Viisireiu

Religion

References

External links
 Saarde official website 

 
Municipalities of Estonia